The Celebs are a celebrity supergroup created by Grahame and Jack Corbyn with the intention of raising money for charity. The group was formed in 2018 and consists of a changing mix of TV presenters, musicians, radio DJs, actors and sports personalities.

History

2018
In 2018, 27 celebrities gathered at Metropolis Studios to record an original Christmas song called "Rock with Rudolph", written and produced by Grahame and Jack Corbyn.  The song was in aid of Great Ormond Street Hospital. It was released digitally through independent record label Saga Entertainment on 30 November 2018. The music video debuted exclusively with The Sun on 29 November 2018 and had its first TV showing on Good Morning Britain on 30 November 2018.

2020

In 2020, amid the COVID-19 pandemic, the Celebs reunited with new members including Frank Bruno and X Factor winner Sam Bailey to raise money for the Alzheimer's Society and Action for Children. They recorded a new rendition of "Merry Christmas Everyone" by Shakin' Stevens and it was released digitally on 11 December 2020 by independent record label Saga Entertainment. The music video debuted on Good Morning Britain the day before the song's release.

2021

In 2021, Saga Entertainment released a cover of The Beatles’ Let It Be, which was produced by Grahame and Jack Corbyn assisted by Stephen Large. The song was recorded at Metropolis Studios, in support of Mind (charity) and released on 3 December 2021. Shona McGarty performed lead vocal backed by The Celebs which this year included Georgia Hirst, Anne Hegerty, Ivan Kaye and Eunice Olumide, amongst others.

Members

2018 lineup

2020 lineup

2021 lineup

2022 lineup

Discography

Singles

Music videos

References

External links
The Celebs on Saga Entertainment

British supergroups
Charity supergroups
Pop music supergroups